

Events

December
 – Mumbai–Ahmedabad high-speed rail corridor scheduled to be completed. It will be India's first high-speed rail line.

Unknown date
 – Gatineau LRT is planned to begin operation.
 – Santiago Metro Line 7 opening.
 – The Bogotá Metro is expected to start operation.
 – Vantaa light rail expected to open.
 –  of the Toulouse Metro opening.
 – Expected completion of the Fehmarn Sound Tunnel.
 – Stage 2 of the Jurong Region MRT line is expected to open.
 – Planned completion of Nambunaeryuk Line.
 – The Los Angeles Metro Rail East San Fernando Light Rail Transit Project is scheduled to begin operations.
 – The Los Angeles Metro Rail Gold Line Foothill Extension Phase 2B to Montclair is scheduled to open, pending funding.
 – The Los Angeles Metro Rail West Santa Ana Branch Transit Corridor is expected to begin operations under an accelerated timeline for completion.
 – The Los Angeles Metro Rail Sepulveda Pass Transit Corridor is expected to begin operations under an accelerated timeline for completion.
 – Tri-Valley-San Joaquin Valley Regional Rail Authority plans to begin rail service between the Tri-Valley and San Joaquin Valley in California.
 – Possible opening of the Northeast Maglev, connecting Baltimore, Maryland and Washington, D.C.
 – Planned opening of the Dallas Area Rapid Transit D2 Subway under Dallas, Texas.
 – Anticipated opening of the Glassboro–Camden Line light rail in New Jersey.

References